The McGrath Foundation is a breast cancer support and education charity in Australia, which raises money to place McGrath Breast Care Nurses in communities across Australia and increase breast health awareness. The charity was founded by Australian cricket player Glenn McGrath and his English-born wife, Jane McGrath, in 2005, following Jane's initial diagnosis and recovery from breast cancer. Jane died on 22 June 2008 at the age of 42.

History 
The McGrath Foundation was created after Jane McGrath was diagnosed with breast cancer, and the mission of the foundation was based on her experiences with her nurses at that time.

Since 2005, the McGrath Foundation has placed 193 McGrath Breast Cancer Nurses in communities across Australia, and has supported over 118,000 families.

The majority of all McGrath Breast Care Nurses are in rural and regional areas. People experiencing breast cancer can directly contact their nearest McGrath Breast Care Nurse, whose support is then provided completely free of charge. The McGrath Foundation needs to raise approximately $390,000 to place each McGrath Breast Care Nurse in the community for a three-year period.

In 2008, the Australian Government pledged $12.6 million to the McGrath Foundation to fund McGrath Breast Care Nurses in 44 communities through to June 2013. This commitment was furthered in 2013 with the announcement of a $18.5 million grant to continue funding 44 existing McGrath Breast Care Nurses in communities nationally as well as the placement of up to an additional 10 full-time equivalent McGrath Breast Care Nurse positions. This was extended for a further four years, in November 2016, confirming the positions of 57 Government-funded McGrath Breast Care Nurses until 2021.

Breast Care Nurses and Qualifications 
The first goal of the McGrath Foundation is to place specialist McGrath Breast Care Nurses wherever they are needed in Australia.

McGrath Breast Care Nurses are highly qualified nurses specifically train to supported families experiencing breast cancer. The role of a McGrath Breast Care Nurse is varied and broad. From the time of diagnosis through to referrals and follow up, McGrath Breast Care Nurses play an important role in the psychosocial, emotional and physical wellbeing of patients and their families.

The first tertiary-based distance education program for breast care nurses was pioneered by La Trobe University in partnership with Cancer Council Victoria in 1997.

McGrath Breast Care Nurses usually have a background in oncology, breast care or women's health and sometimes even psychology. They also require a postgraduate qualification in breast care nursing or cancer nursing, which can be studied at the Australian College of Nursing and La Trobe University. The McGrath Foundation offers four annual scholarships through the Australian College of Nursing.

Breast education 

The second aim of the McGrath Foundation is to promote breast education among Australians.  At only 31 when she was first diagnosed with breast cancer, Jane McGrath was passionate about empowering people to take control of their health by being breast aware.

The McGrath Foundation's breast education programme was developed to ensure everyone in Australia is aware of the importance of breast health, are confident in detecting changes, are knowledgeable about the risk factors for breast cancer and are checking their breasts regularly.

According to the Foundation, the programme "aims to empower young women in particular to look after and know their bodies, and to take action that promotes their health and wellbeing". It includes resources for schools, the workplace and the community with workbooks, presentations and videos available for free download from the McGrath Foundation website.

Partnerships 

In 2008, the McGrath Foundation partnered with Community First Credit Union and developed the McGrath Pink Visa to raise money for McGrath Breast Care Nurses. The McGrath Foundation has a strong corporate partnership programme, and is aligned to several well-known brands that provide fundraising and awareness support.

The McGrath Foundation has over 40 corporate partners including Cricket Australia.

McGrath also reached out to former Ashes adversary Andrew Strauss, who played in a Pink Test himself while captaining England’s successful 2010-11 Ashes campaign, after Strauss also found himself widowed by cancer. Andrew’s wife Ruth, who he had met in Sydney, had passed away from a rare form of lung cancer on 29 December 2018 after Strauss had stepped down as England’s director of cricket to look after her. Ahead of the 2019 edition of the Ashes in England, it was announced that Day 2 of the Lord’s Test would benefit the Ruth Strauss Foundation in much the same way that Day 3 of the Sydney Test benefits the McGrath Foundation.

Controversy 
The McGrath Foundation used to have a relationship with the greyhound racing industry. After the allegations of live baiting were made in the media in 2015, the McGrath Foundation ceased the relationship.

McGrath Foundation initiatives 

The McGrath Foundation hosts a variety of events and community fundraising initiatives each year to support its vision.

Sydney Pink Test – Each January, the Sydney Cricket Ground turns into a sea of pink on day three of the Sydney Pink Test in honour of Jane McGrath.  The Sydney Pink Test has become the iconic centrepiece of the Cricket Australia and McGrath Foundation partnership, through the community action program Cricket Cares.

Pink Stumps Day – Pink Stumps Day allows people to bring the spirit of the Pink Test into their own community by providing clubs, businesses and schools the opportunity to show off their cricket skills and fundraise for the McGrath Foundation.

McGrath Foundation High Tea – Jane McGrath and best friend Tracy Bevan, Ambassador and Director of the McGrath Foundation, hosted a high tea as one of the Foundation's first fundraising initiatives. The McGrath Foundation continues to host high teas in Sydney and Melbourne as a way to connect with supporters and raise funds.

Ambassadors and supporters 

Tracy Bevan was best friend to Jane McGrath and is the official ambassador, as well as a director, of the McGrath Foundation. The McGrath Foundation has had many Australian entertainers and sporting personalities supporting their cause as "Foundation Friends", including:

 Adam Gilchrist, former Australian Cricket World Cup-winning wicketkeeper
 Adam Harvey, country music singer
 Andrew Reid, Bondi Lifeguard & star of Bondi Rescue
 Billy & Nicole Slater, Melbourne Storm NRL Player, artist & photographer
 Ellyse Perry, Australian women's cricketer & soccer player
 England's Barmy Army- The Barmy Army have produced pink shirts supporting the McGrath Foundation for when England is playing in the Pink Test.
 Erin Molan, TV personality
 Julie Goodwin, MasterChef winner
 Lucy Durack, entertainer
 Michael & Kyly Clarke, former Australian Cricket World Cup-winning captain, model & presenter
 Shane Watson & Lee Watson, former Australian Cricket World Cup-winning all-rounder, presenter & reporter
 Wendell Sailor, Australian former rugby league and rugby union footballer
 Virat Kohli, Indian cricket captain and Cricket World Cup winner

References

External links
 The McGrath Foundation
 Official Facebook page

2005 establishments in Australia
Health charities in Australia
Charities based in Australia
Breast cancer organizations
Medical and health organisations based in New South Wales